Albert  Adomakoh (April 8, 1922 – August 16, 2016) was an economist and a Governor of the Bank of Ghana. He was governor from 10 September 1965 to 9 February 1968.

References

Ghanaian economists
Governors of Bank of Ghana
1922 births
2016 deaths